The Oldcastle branch line was a railway line in County Meath, Ireland. It was part of a branch line off the main line between Belfast and Dublin, connecting to Drogheda. This line was connected to the Midland Great Western line from Clonsilla to Navan in 1862. The Oldcastle line itself was not opened until March 17, 1863 and served passengers for a hundred years.

According to commemorative plaques on the site of the old station, the line was just under 13 miles long, took two and a half years to build, and cost £73,683,14s,3d.

History
Oldcastle's train yard consisted of a warehouse and station master's house built in Italianate style. By the early 1910s, four trains operated on the line; none on Sundays. The station handled parcels, passengers, furniture, carriages, portable engines, and livestock, serving as the heart of Oldcastle's market economy. The station had a crane capable of lifting 3 tons.

According to commemorative plaques, the rail line was also useful for locals who traveled in and out of Oldcastle; the workhouse would use the line to send patients down to Dublin for specialised treatments. In 1895, a "development committee" promoted the rail line as a means of boosting tourism in Oldcastle.

During World War I, Oldcastle housed a detention camp for prisoners of war. On 12 December 1914, the rail line was used to transport 68 German prisoners into the town. Two days later, another 26 civilians were moved into the camp. This continued steadily from late 1914 to 1915; 304 inmates were in the camp by February 1915. This number increased to 579 by June 1916. This was reported on by the Meath Chronicle, writing 'The long expected German prisoners arrived this week in Oldcastle and took up quarters in the disused workhouse'. John Smith also wrote an article on the subject.

In 1950, nationalisation of CIÉ (the State transport company in the Republic) threatened the existence of several lines, and in April 1958, the Oldcastle railway lost its passenger service. For most of its history, steam locomotives operated on the Oldcastle railway, but between 1949 and 1960, huge investment was made in diesel engines. On 30 April 1963, most goods services were withdrawn and the line from Navan to Oldcastle was closed. The line to Drogheda was kept open for gypsum traffic from Kingscourt until 2001 and some of the track to Kells was relaid in 1977 for zinc and lead traffic from Tara Mine and this still operates as of 2022.

Dismantlement and legacy
After 1963, the Oldcastle line was left to deteriorate. Most tracks west of Navan were ripped up but a single-arch bridge, Cooney's Bridge, built over the line in the late 1800s remains intact to this day (the National Inventory of Architectural Heritage argues that the bridge was built in 1880 but carvings in the bridge's stonework clearly date it back to 1862).

The station master's house is now a private residence. The train yard has been broken up between the Oldcastle Co-Operative Limited and Gleneagle Woodcraft Limited

In the late 2010s, the Oldcastle Tidy Towns Committee created a garden and set up plaques in commemoration of Oldcastle Railway. Oldcastle Co-Operative co-funded the community project. The old station's crane was restored and placed in the garden.

Gallery

See also
Dublin-Navan railway line
Bibliography of Irish rail transport
History of rail transport in Ireland
Oldcastle, County Meath

References 

Rail transport in Ireland
Midland Great Western Railway